The geographic centre of Uganda is north of Lake Kyoga in Olyaka village, Olyaka parish in Namasale sub-county in Amolatar District, Northern Uganda.

The point is marked by the Amolatar Monument which displays the names of all ethnic tribes in Uganda. The Amolatar peninsula offered refuge to different tribes during the Karimojong cattle rustling of the 1970s through to the 1980s and early 1990s most of whom ended up settling in the district. Once a year, in September, people from all tribes of the region gather at this place and pray.

The method by which the coordinates of this geographical centre were determined is not known. The centre point of a bounding box completely enclosing the area of Uganda results in another pair of coordinates (1.368153|N|32.303236|E) which belongs to a point along Kampala–Gulu Highway, west of Lake Kyoga.

References

Uganda
Geography of Uganda